The RTL8710 is a low-cost Wi-Fi chip with full TCP/IP stack and MCU (Micro Controller Unit) capability produced by Taiwanese manufacturer, Realtek.

References 

Wireless networking hardware